Shimit Amin is an Indian film director and editor. He is best known for the award-winning film Chak De! India (2007) starring Shah Rukh Khan.

Biography 
Amin was born in Kampala, Uganda  but grew up in Florida, in the United States. While he was enamored with film culture from an early age, his parents pressed him to be more conventional in his college studies; he graduated with a degree in mathematics from the University of Florida. After playing a significant role in organizing and promoting North Florida's first international film festival, The 1991 Asian/Asian American International Film Festival, in Jacksonville, Florida, Amin moved to Miami and primarily worked on industrial/corporate and small independent film projects. After about a year in Miami, Amin traveled to California where he worked on independent films before beginning to work, in many behind the camera roles with major Hollywood directors. his energy, film knowledge, and high quality work attracted the attention of Bollywood filmmakers. From Los Angeles, he moved on to working in the Indian film industry.

Amin received an editing position on the Hindi film Bhoot (2003) through a friend while still living in L.A. It was during this time that he became involved in Ab Tak Chhappan (2004). The film was a box office success.  He next became involved with  Chak De! India, which opened to critical and financial success. His latest film, Rocket Singh: Salesman of the Year, reunited him with two colleagues from Chak De! India

 Filmography 
  2004 - Ab Tak Chhappan  2007 - Chak De! India  2009 - Rocket Singh: Salesman of the Year  2012 - The Reluctant Fundamentalist - Film Editor 
  2013 - Shuddh Desi Romance - Served as a consultant
 2020 - A Suitable Boy - Netflix/BBC Series - Episode#4 - Director.

 Awards 
Winner

National Film Awards
 2008 - National Film Award for Best Popular Film Providing Wholesome Entertainment for Chak De IndiaFilmfare Awards
 2008 - Best Film (Critics) for Chak De IndiaIIFA Awards
 2008 - Best Director for Chak De IndiaApsara Awards
 2008 - Best Director for Chak De IndiaStardust Awards
 2008 - Best Director (Editor's Choice) for Chak De IndiaOther Awards
 2007 - CNN-IBN Indian of the Year (Entertainment) for Chak De India 2008 - V.Shantaram Award for Best Director for Chak De India''

References

External links 
 

Living people
Ugandan people of Indian descent
Ugandan emigrants to the United States
Year of birth missing (living people)
People from Kampala
American film directors of Indian descent
Hindi-language film directors
American film editors
Directors who won the Best Popular Film Providing Wholesome Entertainment National Film Award
Screen Awards winners
International Indian Film Academy Awards winners